is a Japanese voice actress.

Filmography

Television
Digimon Adventure – Patamon
Digimon Adventure 02 – Patamon
Digimon Tamers – Mako
Digimon Frontier – Kokuwamon
Cardcaptor Sakura – Chiharu Mihara
Cardcaptor Sakura: Clear Card – Chiharu Mihara
Fruits Basket (2001) – Rika Aida (ep22)
Wedding Peach – Jama-P
Nurse Angel Ririka SOS – Rumi

Film
Cardcaptor Sakura Movie 2: The Sealed Card – Chiharu Mihara
Digimon Adventure tri. – Patamon
Digimon Adventure: Last Evolution Kizuna – Patamon
Digimon Frontier: Ancient Digimon Revival – Pucchiemon

Video games
Digimon Adventure – Patamon

References

External links

1971 births
Living people
Japanese video game actresses
Japanese voice actresses
Voice actresses from Fukuoka Prefecture